Musaabad-e Olya (also Romanized as Mūsáābād-e ‘Olyā) is a village in Rumiani Rural District, Suri District, Rumeshkhan County, Lorestan Province, Iran. It lies north-north-east of the village of Hoseynabad. At the 2006 census, its population was 715, in 139 families.

References 

Populated places in Rumeshkhan County